Mornaguia is a town and commune in the Manouba Governorate, Tunisia, located 14 kilometres from Tunis. As of 2004 it had a population of 13,382.

Attached administratively to the Manouba Governorate, it is a municipality with 19 834 inhabitants in 2014  2  .  The capital of a delegation, it is an important agricultural center for the fertile Mornag plain.  Touched by the urban sprawl of the Tunis urban agglomeration, it is one of the cities with strong growth, especially since it is located on the Tunis-Medjez el-Bab (A3) motorway .

It consists of several districts: Tebaltech, Bouhnach, Sidi Ali El Hattab, Ksar Hadid, El Fejja, Hmaiem, Menzel Habib, Bouregba and Tahouna.

It is also known for housing a civilian prison.

See also
List of cities in Tunisia

References

Populated places in Tunisia
Communes of Tunisia
Tunisia geography articles needing translation from French Wikipedia